Major General Frank Parker (September 21, 1872 – March 13, 1947) was a United States Army officer who had a distinguished military career spanning over forty years, which included service in the Spanish–American War and World War I. He served with distinction during the latter conflict, commanding a regiment, a brigade, and a division, and earning numerous decorations for gallantry in the process. His awards include the Army Distinguished Service Medal, two Silver Star Citations, and numerous foreign decorations and civilian accolades.

Early life
Frank Parker was born September 21, 1872, in Georgetown County, South Carolina. He was descended from John Parker, Arthur Middleton, Thomas Heyward and John Rutledge.

Parker attended the University of South Carolina, where he was a member of Phi Kappa Psi fraternity. He subsequently attended the United States Military Academy and graduated in 1894, after which he served in the Spanish–American War in 1898 and Puerto Rico from 1899 to 1900. He also served as an instructor at the United States Military Academy from 1900 to 1903.

In 1904, Parker graduated from the Cavalry School in Saumur, France, and served as military attaché, Caracas, Venezuela, from 1904 to 1905, Buenos Aires, Argentina, from 1905 to 1906, and Cuba in 1906 to 1908. He was an instructor and organizer of cavalry in Cuba from 1909 to 1912. In 1912, Parker attended the École Supérieure de Guerre, France. He was a member of the Cavalry Board from 1913 to 1914.

World War I

Parker returned to the École Supérieure de Guerre from 1914 to 1915. He was a United States observer with French armies in field from 1916 to 1917, and then served as chief of American Military Mission at French General Headquarters.

With the American entry into World War I in 1917, Parker was promoted to brigadier general and was the commander 18th Infantry and 1st Infantry Brigade and then was appointed commander, 1st Division, American Expeditionary Force, in October 1918.

Post-war career
Parker was recommended for promotion to major general by General John J. Pershing, but the Armistice stopped all promotions of general officers. In 1920, he graduated from the École Supérieure de Guerre, France and remained there as a professor while a student at the Centre des Hautes Études from 1920 to 1921. Then, he graduated and instructed at the Command and Staff School, Fort Leavenworth, in 1922, was graduate and instructor at the Army War College from 1923 to 1924. From 1925 to 1927 he commanded a brigade of the 1st Division.

In 1927, Parker received the honorary degree of LL.D. from the University of South Carolina. He was Assistant Chief of Staff from 1927 to 1929, and commander of the Sixth Corps Area. He was promoted to major general in 1929, and from 1932 to 1933 he headed the Philippine Department. In 1933, Philippine Department received a degree in Agriculture and Applied Science from Michigan State College. He was decorated with Order of the Crown of Italy for his service in connection with aid for transatlantic flight of Italo Balbo.

From 1933 to 1935, Philippine Department commanded the 1st Division. In February 1936, he took command of the Eighth Corps Area and commanded the Third Army from March to September 1936.

Retirement
After his retirement on September 30, 1936, Parker made his home in Chicago. He served as the Executive Director of the Illinois War Council during World War II.

Parker died on March 13, 1947, in Chicago, Illinois, and was buried at Mansfield City Cemetery in Mansfield, Ohio.

Parker was married to Katherine Hamilton Lahm.

References

Bibliography

External links

1872 births
1947 deaths
United States military attachés
Military personnel from South Carolina
United States Military Academy faculty
Burials in Ohio
American military personnel of the Spanish–American War
United States Army generals of World War I
United States Army Command and General Staff College alumni
United States Military Academy alumni
Recipients of the Distinguished Service Medal (US Army)
Recipients of the Silver Star
United States Army War College alumni
People from Georgetown County, South Carolina
United States Army generals
United States Army War College faculty
United States Army Command and General Staff College faculty